Luis Molina (born March 22, 1974, in Chinandega, Nicaragua) is a baseball coach who is most notable for coaching for Panama in the 2009 World Baseball Classic. He wore number 5.

Professional career
Signed as a free agent by the Mariners in September 14, 1992. Began pro career in Peoria in 1993. Spent 1996 in Lancaster, but had a season cut short after being placed on the disabled list with a knee injury.

References

Living people
1974 births